Callogobius snelliusi is a species of goby found in the Western Pacific Ocean from Japan, to Indonesia, and then the east coast of northern Australia.

Size

Etymology
The fish is named in honor of the Dutch hydrographic research vessel Snellius, which was involved in collecting the type specimen.

References

Gobiidae
Taxa named by Frederik Petrus Koumans
Fish described in 1953
Fish of the Pacific Ocean